Plains Mill is a historic mill complex at 14767 Plains Mill Road near the town of Timberville in rural Rockingham County, Virginia, USA. The mill building is a two-story wood-frame construction, built between 1847 and 1849, on the banks of the North Fork Shenandoah River, where a stream falls over the bank into the river, providing the mill's power. The building has been sheathed in metal siding, although its original weatherboard siding remains underneath. A set of grain bins were added to the south side of the building in 1923, and a two-story wing was added to the north after World War II. The mill was in continuous use from its construction until 1994, encapsulating the evolutionary history of mill development in that time.

The mill and a c. 1959 office building were listed on the National Register of Historic Places in 2014.

See also
National Register of Historic Places listings in Rockingham County, Virginia

References

Grinding mills on the National Register of Historic Places in Virginia
Federal architecture in Virginia
Industrial buildings completed in 1849
Buildings and structures in Rockingham County, Virginia
National Register of Historic Places in Rockingham County, Virginia
Grinding mills in Virginia
1849 establishments in Virginia
Timberville, Virginia